Acaulospora mellea is a species of fungi in the family Acaulosporaceae. It forms arbuscular mycorrhiza and vesicles in roots.

External links
Index Fungorum

References 

Diversisporales